Victoria Rose "Tori" Sullivan (born August 4, 1996) is an American ice hockey forward, currently playing with the Boston Pride of the Premier Hockey Federation (PHF).

Playing career 
During high school, she played for the HoneyBaked Hockey Club in her home state of Michigan, winning three state championships.

In 2014, she began attending Boston College and playing college ice hockey with the Boston College Eagles women's team in the Hockey East conference of the NCAA Division I. She scored 28 points in 39 games in her rookie collegiate season, being named to the Hockey East All-Rookie Team. She missed all but two games during the 2016–17 season, however, being redshirted due to injury. In 2017, she transferred to Northeastern University, and would spend the last two years of her collegiate eligibility with the Northeastern Huskies, finishing her college career with 98 points in 154 games. Sullivan won the Hockey East championship with Northeastern in 2019.

After graduating, she signed her first professional contract with the Boston Pride of the NWHL; a one-year, $5000 contract, becoming the second player to sign with the Pride in the 2019 off-season. She scored 25 points in 24 games in her rookie season, good for thirteenth in the league. She also tied for first in the league in powerplay goals, and the Pride qualified for the Isobel Cup finals before the season was cancelled due to the COVID-19 pandemic in the United States. During the season, she was also noted for her social media work managing the team's TikTok account with teammate Christina Putigna.

She re-signed with the Pride for the 2020–21 NWHL season, with Pride general manager Karilyn Pilch stating that "if the NWHL had an award for Best Dangles, Tori would win unanimously."

International career  
Sullivan represented the United States at the 2014 IIHF World Women's U18 Championship in Hungary, notching one goal in five games as the country won silver.

Personal life  
Sullivan has a degree in behavioral neuroscience from Northeastern University. She previously attended Mercy High School in Farmington Hills, Michigan.

Career stats

Sources:

Honors 
Week of November 3, 2014 Pro Ambitions/WHEA Rookie of the Week
2014–15 Hockey East All-Rookie Team
2014–15 Boston College Athletic Director's Award for Academic Achievement
2014–15 Hockey East All-Academic Team
2015–16 Boston College Athletic Director's Award for Academic Achievement
2015–16 Hockey East All-Academic Team
2018–19 Hockey East All-Academic Team
Sources:

References

External links
 
 
 

1996 births
Living people
American women's ice hockey forwards
Boston Pride players
Ice hockey players from Michigan
People from West Bloomfield, Michigan
Northeastern Huskies women's ice hockey players
Boston College Eagles women's ice hockey players
Boston College alumni